Ane Etxezarreta Ayerbe (born 24 August 1995), also spelled as Ane Etxezarreta Aierbe, is a Spanish footballer who plays as a defender for Real Sociedad.

Club career
Etxezarreta started her career at Beasain. She has played more than 100 games for Real Sociedad. With them, she won the 2018–19 Copa de la Reina.

References

External links
Profile at Real Sociedad

1995 births
Living people
Women's association football defenders
Spanish women's footballers
People from Beasain
Sportspeople from Gipuzkoa
Footballers from the Basque Country (autonomous community)
Oiartzun KE players
Real Sociedad (women) players
Primera División (women) players